Jimmy Mulilo Chisenga Chilufya (born 3 April 1992) is a Zambian international footballer who plays as a right back for Red Arrows.

References

1992 births
Living people
Zambian footballers
Zambia international footballers
Red Arrows F.C. players
Association football fullbacks
2009 African Nations Championship players
Zambia A' international footballers